Buzacott is a surname. Notable people with the surname include:

Aaron Buzacott (1800–1864), missionary
Charles Hardie Buzacott (1835–1918), Australian journalist
Richard Buzacott (1867–1934), Australian politician

See also
Kevin Buzzacott (born 1947), Aboriginal elder